The 2002 Korean FA Cup, known as the 2002 Hana-Seoul Bank FA Cup, was the seventh edition of the Korean FA Cup.

Qualifying rounds

First round

Second round

Final rounds

Bracket

Third round
Six clubs won by default: Daejeon Citizen, Pohang Steelers, Seongnam Ilhwa Chunma, Suwon Samsung Bluewings, Jeonbuk Hyundai Motors and Busan I'Cons.

Round of 16

Quarter-finals

Semi-finals

Final

See also
2002 in South Korean football
2002 K League
2002 Korean League Cup

References

External links
Official website
Fixtures & Results at KFA

2002
2002 in South Korean football
2002 domestic association football cups